Weledeh (or Yellowknife - Weledeh) was a territorial electoral district for the Legislative Assembly of the Northwest Territories, Canada.

It was one of seven districts that represent Yellowknife, and included the more rural communities of Detah and N'Dilo.

The riding was dissolved for the 2015 election, with the Yellowknife portion transferred to a new district of Yellowknife North and the Detah-N'Dilo portion merged with Tu Nedhe to create the new district of Tu Nedhé-Wiilideh.

Members of the Legislative Assembly (MLAs)

Election results

2011 election

2007 election

2003 election

1999 election

Notes

References

External links
 Website of the Legislative Assembly of Northwest Territories

Former electoral districts of Northwest Territories
Yellowknife